Cicero is a town in Jackson Township, Hamilton County, Indiana, United States, north of Indianapolis. The population was 4,812 at the 2010 census.

Cicero is notable for welcoming teenaged AIDS activist Ryan White to its community in 1987. White is buried in Cicero.

History
Cicero was founded in 1835. The town took its name from Cicero Creek. The first post office in Jackson Township was established at Cicero in 1839.

Geography
Cicero is located on the northeast shore of Morse Reservoir, at  (40.127568, -86.018375).

Demographics

Cicero is largely a lakeside community.

2010 census
As of the census of 2010, there were 4,812 people, 1,952 households, and 1,381 families living in the town. The racial makeup of the town was 96.8% White, 0.6% African American, 0.6% Native American, 0.5% Asian, 0.4% from other races, and 1.1% from two or more races. Hispanic or Latino of any race were 1.5% of the population.

There were 1,952 households, of which 34.8% had children under the age of 18 living with them, 53.6% were married couples living together, 11.3% had a female householder with no husband present, 5.8% had a male householder with no wife present, and 29.3% were non-families. 24.5% of all households were made up of individuals, and 8.2% had someone living alone who was 65 years of age or older. The average household size was 2.47 and the average family size was 2.89.

The median age in the town was 39.8 years. 25.2% of residents were under the age of 18; 6.6% were between the ages of 18 and 24; 25.6% were from 25 to 44; 31% were from 45 to 64; and 11.6% were 65 years of age or older. The gender makeup of the town was 49.2% male and 50.8% female.

2000 census
As of the census of 2000, there were 4,303 people, 1,716 households, and 1,257 families living in the town. The racial makeup of the town was 97.89% White, 0.19% African American, 0.30% Native American, 0.28% Asian, 0.02% Pacific Islander, 0.63% from other races, and 0.70% from two or more races. Hispanic or Latino of any race were 1.12% of the population.

There were 1,716 households, out of which 36.0% had children living with them, 59.2% were married couples living together, 10.0% had a female householder with no husband present, and 26.7% were non-families. 21.4% of all households were made up of individuals, and 6.5% had someone living alone who was 65 years of age or older. The average household size was 2.51 and the average family size was 2.92.

In the town, the population was spread out, with 26.4% under the age of 18, 8.2% from 18 to 24, 32.3% from 25 to 44, 24.6% from 45 to 64, and 8.5% who were 65 years of age or older. The median age was 36 years. For every 100 females, there were 96.2 males. For every 100 females age 18 and over, there were 96.0 males.

The median income for a household in the town was $54,561, and the median income for a family was $60,559. Males had a median income of $39,131 versus $29,574 for females. The per capita income for the town was $23,169. About 0.7% of families and 1.7% of the population were below the poverty line, including none of those under age 18 and 2.8% of those age 65 or over.

Education
Cicero is served by Hamilton Heights School Corporation, Indiana Academy and Cicero Seventh-day Adventist Elementary School.

The town has a lending library, the Hamilton North Public Library.

Media
The plot of the episode entitled "The Kids Are All Right" from the TV series Supernatural  took place in the town of Cicero, Indiana. However, it does not accurately depict the town, much to the disappointment of certain fans.

Cicero Seventh-day Adventist Church is the home of the Hope for Life television ministry, with Pastors Aaron Clark, Vic Van Schaik, and Associate Pastor Cristopher Saures.

The town was represented in the 1989 biopic The Ryan White Story as the town to which Ryan White moved order to escape prejudice in Kokomo, Indiana. However, it is only featured in the last  two scenes of the movie.

References

External links

 Town of Cicero, Indiana website

Towns in Hamilton County, Indiana
Towns in Indiana
Indianapolis metropolitan area